The 3rd Critics' Choice Super Awards, presented by the Critics Choice Association and honoring the best in genre fiction film and television. The nominees were announced on February 22, 2023. The winners were announced on March 16, 2023.

The Batman led the film field with six nominations, while The Boys, Evil, House of the Dragon, and What We Do in the Shadows, tied for the most television nominations, garnering four.

Winners and nominees

Film

Television

Most nominations

Film

Television

Most wins

Film

Television

See also 
 28th Critics' Choice Awards

References 

2023 awards in the United States
Critics Choice
Critics Choice